The 2021 Rugby League World Cup knockout stage takes place after the group stages of the 2021 Men's Rugby League World Cup, and will end with the Final, at Old Trafford. The quarter-finals comprise eight teams; the top two teams from each group; Group A, Group B, Group C and Group D. All quarter-finalists automatically qualified for the 2025 Rugby League World Cup.

Bracket

Quarter-finals

Quarter-final 1: Australia vs Lebanon

Quarter-final 2: England vs Papua New Guinea
Catherine, Princess of Wales attended this match in her capacity as patron of the Rugby Football League.

Quarter-final 3: New Zealand vs Fiji

Quarter-final 4: Tonga vs Samoa

Semi-finals

Semi-final 1: Australia vs New Zealand

Semi-final 2: England vs Samoa 
Samoa faced England in the semi-final at the Emirates Stadium in London. Tim Lafai scored the first try of the game in the sixth minute to give Samoa a 4–0 lead, and for the first time in the tournament, England conceded first. Five minutes later, Junior Paulo was shown a yellow card, and also put on report, for a dangerous tackle on George Williams. Elliott Whitehead scored England's first try on 25 minutes, with Tommy Makinson successful with the conversion, to give England a 6–4 lead. Five minutes later, Samoa scored again, this time from Ligi Sao to retake the lead 8–4; Stephen Crichton was successful with the conversion to give Samoa a 10–4 lead at half-time.

Five minutes into the second half, England scored again, this time through John Bateman, and Makinson was once again successful with the conversion to make it 10–10. Two tries in seven minutes saw Samoa take a 20–12 lead, with England now needing at least two tries to draw level. Herbie Farnworth broke clear on 65 minutes, to race away and touch down near the posts, giving Makinson an easy conversion. From the kick-off, England were awarded a penalty, after Sam Tomkins was tackled in the air. Samoa used the captain's challenge, and after a quick review, the video referee agreed with the decision to award the penalty, meaning the challenge was unsuccessful. Makinson opted to kick the penalty and was successful, levelling the scores at 20–20 with just over 12 minutes remaining. Stephen Crichton looked to have won it for Samoa with sven minutes to go, as he intercepted a Dom Young pass to touch down under the posts, converting his own try. There was more drama to come, as Farnworth got his second try of the game with two minutes remaining, Makinson once again converting to take the game to extra time.

Samoa attempted to score the golden point with a drop goal early in extra time, but it was charged down by England. Samoa eventually won the match after a forward pass from Sam Tomkins gave them possession 35 metres out. Crichton kicked the winning drop goal to send Samoa to their first World Cup final, making them the first team other than England, Australia or New Zealand to reach the final in 50 years.

The peak TV audience for the match was approximately 2.5 million views, which is the highest for any international rugby league match.

Final: Australia vs Samoa

References

2021 Rugby League World Cup